Robert McNamara (1916–2009) was an American business executive and cabinet member.

Robert or Bob McNamara may also refer to:

 Robert McNamara (figure skater) (born 1987), Australian figure skater
 Robert Craig McNamara, president and owner of Sierra Orchards
 Bob McNamara (baseball) (1916–2011), Major League Baseball player
 Bob McNamara (Canadian football) (1931–2014), Canadian and American football player
 Bob McNamara (sports executive) (born 1961), Canadian sports executive